In Search of Harperfield is the third studio album by Scottish singer-songwriter and musician Emma Pollock, released on 29 January 2016 by Chemikal Underground, and was her first studio album in five and a half years following 2010's The Law of Large Numbers.

On release, the album received critical acclaim but it failed to chart. Uncut magazine included it in their Top 75 albums of 2016 list at No. 65.

Track listing

Personnel
Credits are adapted from the album's liner notes.

Musicians
Emma Pollock – lead and background vocals; guitar; bass guitar; keyboards; piano; xylophone; dulcimer
Paul Savage – drums; programming; guitar; bass guitar; keyboards; string arrangements; percussion
Additional musicians 
David McAulay – guitar; bass guitar; drum machine
Malcolm Lindsay – strings; string arrangements; cello
Michael John McCarthy – keyboards; accordion
Cairn String Quartet – strings; string arrangements 
RM Hubbert – guitar
Graeme Smillie – piano
Jackie Baxter – cello

Production and artwork
Paul Savage – producer; engineer; mixer; mastering
Niall Smillie – artwork

References

External links

2016 albums
Emma Pollock albums
Chemikal Underground albums